Ferapontievca is a commune and village in the Gagauz Autonomous Territorial Unit of the Republic of Moldova.  The 2004 census listed the commune as having a population of 1,008 people.   Gagauz total 282. "Minorities" included 59 Moldovans, 60 Russians, 583 Ukrainians, 17 Bulgarians and 3 Roma.

Its geographical coordinates are 46° 14' 24" North, 28° 46' 28" East.

References

Ferapontievca